Sambhav Nepal is a non-profit organization based in Nepal.

Background
Sambhav Nepal was founded by Prem Kumar Khatry in 2007. The organization mainly works for education, health and sanitation in underdeveloped villages of northern parts of Gorkha district, in western Nepal. The organization also facilitates volunteers at the villages. Also, the organization pays for education and living of some underprivileged children of those villages.

Main programs

Child Sponsorship
Sambhav Nepal currently sponsors 12 brilliant children coming from back warded families of villages like Aarupokhari, Manbu of Gorkha. It sponsors for their education, food, stationery, medical emergencies and other expenses in Gorkha and Kathmandu.

Voluntourism
Sambhav Nepal facilitates volunteers from different countries at the schools and local development activities of these villages. The volunteers are made available under a special program called Voluntourism, of a popular travel company in Kathmandu.

Other projects
Besides, Sambhav Nepal has earlier built a 5-stalled toilet in a local school of Aarupokhari. Also, it has made a community library at another school, which was inaugurated by Susan Grace, Australian Ambassador to Nepal. Sambhav Nepal has also worked on renovation of old schools in those areas.

Donors
Donors of Sambhav Nepal are from all around the world. Some of the countries the donors are from are: Switzerland, Australia, Canada, United States, Israel and Belgium. Ace the Himalaya also donates a part of its annual income to Sambhav Nepal's projects.

Partners and Supporters
Below are listed the partners and supporters of Sambhav Nepal:
Sambhav Nepal – Schweiz
Rotary Australia World Community Service
Australian Embassy of Nepal
The Rotary Club of Wahroonga, Australia
Rotary Club of Chatswood, Australia (supporter)
Pymble Public School, Australia
The Rotary Club of Mount Everest, Kathmandu, Nepal

See also
Voluntourism

References

External links
Official website
Facebook Page

Child-related organisations in Nepal
Charities based in Nepal
2007 establishments in Nepal